Sigma Films  is a film production company based in Glasgow, Scotland. The company was formed in 1996 by Gillian Berrie, David Mackenzie and Alastair Mackenzie – a producer, director and actor respectively. Over the last twenty years the company has been responsible for film releases including Starred Up (2013),  Under the Skin (2013), Perfect Sense (2011), Hallam Foe (2007), Red Road (2006), Young Adam (2003) and Dear Frankie (2004). In 2017, Sigma began production on big-budget historical epic Outlaw King for Netflix.

The company regularly co-produces films with international partners such as Lars von Trier's company Zentropa Entertainments – including Dogville (2003), Manderlay (2005), After the Wedding (2006), Dear Wendy (2004), Brothers (2004) and Wilbur Wants to Kill Himself (2002).

Sigma have their production and post-production facility Film City Glasgow.

History 
Gillian Berrie began by making David Mackenzie's short films California Sunshine (1997) and Somersault (2000) before she went on to produce Mackenzie's debut feature The Last Great Wilderness (2002). The film stars Alastair Mackenzie and was co-produced by Zentropa and premiered in Toronto in 2002.

Following their first feature, David Mackenzie directed Young Adam (2003) starring Ewan McGregor and Tilda Swinton. The film premiered at Cannes Film Festival 2003 in the Un Certain Regard competition and won Best Film and Best Director at the 2003 BAFTA Scotland Awards.

Meanwhile, Sigma strengthened links with co-producer Zentropa, developing the Advance Party Project created from an idea by Gillian Berrie, Sisse Graum Jorgensen, and Lars von Trier. Advance Party was specifically designed to break feature film debutant directors into the industry and produced Andrea Arnold's Red Road (2006) and Morag MacKinnon's Donkeys (2010). Both films star a mixture of the same characters and cast including Kate Dickie, Martin Compston, Natalie Press, Tony Curran and James Cosmo. Red Road played in the Palme d'Or competition at Cannes Film Festival in 2006, winning the Jury Prize, whilst Donkeys won Best Film at the 2011 BAFTA Scotland Awards.

Gillian and David's second feature film collaboration was Hallam Foe (2007), starring Jamie Bell and Sophia Myles. It won many awards including a Silver Bear in Berlin 2007, the Golden Hitchcock and Kodak Award for Cinematography at the Dinard Festival of British Cinema 2007, and the 2008 National Board of Review Award for Top Independent Film, as well as numerous other nominations including for Bell and Myles' performances.

Sigma and Zentropa collaborated again to make David Mackenzie's sixth feature film, sci-fi romance Perfect Sense (2011). The film follows a burgeoning romance between Ewan McGregor and Eva Green against the backdrop of a global epidemic of people losing their senses one by one. The film premiered at the Sundance Film Festival in 2011 and picked up numerous awards at film festivals around the world including Edinburgh, Bratislava and Philadelphia International Film Festivals.

Immediately after Perfect Sense, Mackenzie directed the comedy musical You Instead (2011) [released as Tonight You're Mine in the US] starring Luke Treadaway and Natalie Tena. Astonishingly it was filmed over four and a half days at the Scottish music festival T in the Park in 2010 where the cast and crew had to adopt a kind of guerrilla filmmaking approach to shoot amidst the chaos of a music festival alongside over 100,000 revellers. It premiered at both T in the Park in 2011 and at Austin's SXSW.

Sigma's Brian Coffey collaborated with Irish production company Blinder Films to produce Ciaran Foy's Citadel (2012). Foy's involvement in the film was a result of Advance Party II. The film stars Aneurin Barnard and James Cosmo and it premiered at SXSW 2012 where it won the Midnighter Audience Award.

Next, Sigma produced Starred Up (2013), again directed by David Mackenzie and starring Jack O'Connell alongside Ben Mendelsohn and Rupert Friend. The story is based upon writer Jonathan Asser's real-life experiences as a voluntary therapist in a London prison. The film was critically acclaimed and won numerous awards including the BAFTA Scotland 2014 Best Film and Best Director Awards, seven BIFA nominations and holds a remarkable 99% Rotten Tomatoes score.

Sigma also co-produced Jonathan Glazer's multi-award winning Under the Skin (2013) starring Scarlett Johansson. The majority of the film was shot undercover with hidden cameras and non-actors in real locations in Scotland. The film had its World Premiere at Telluride at the same time as Starred Up, then played Venice Film Festival and has since won over 20 awards and 90 nominations all over the world.

More recently, Brian Coffey at Sigma produced Robert Carlyle's directorial debut The Legend of Barney Thomson starring Carlyle, Emma Thompson and Ray Winstone. The film opened the 2015 Edinburgh International Film Festival and won Best Film at the 2015 Scottish BAFTAs. Coffey also produced director Colin Kennedy's first-feature, Swung (2015), starring Elena Anaya, Owen McDonnell and Elizabeth McGovern also premiered at EIFF and received nominations at the BAFTA Scotland Awards.

Coffey's latest production, supernatural horror film Hush (2017), stars Florence Pugh, Ben Lloyd-Hughes and Celia Imrie. The film was made in association with L.A. based Thruline Entertainment and is directed by Icelandic filmmaker Olaf de Fleur Johannesson.

In late 2016, Sigma begun work on a TV pilot called Damnation for the USA Network which is directed by Mackenzie and exec produced by Berrie. Described as an epic saga of the secret history of the 1930s American heartland, it chronicles the mythic conflict and bloody struggle between big money and the downtrodden, God and greed, charlatans and prophets. The show stars Logan Marshall-Green and Killian Scott. Tony Tost, James Mangold, David Mackenzie, Gillian Berrie and Entertainment 360s Guymon Casady and Daniel Rappaport executive produce for Universal Cable Productions. In May 2017, Damnation was picked up to series by the USA Network and will be released by Netflix outside of the US.

In 2017, production began on David Mackenzie's tenth feature, Outlaw King. The film stars Chris Pine as Robert the Bruce, with Aaron Taylor-Johnson playing James Douglas, Florence Pugh playing Elizabeth de Burgh and Billy Howle as Edward, the Prince of Wales. Sigma Films' Gillian Berrie is producing the historical epic which will be released internationally on Netflix.

Over the years, Sigma Films has also produced a number of up and coming director's short films including Johnny Barrington – Trout (2007) & Terra Firma (2008), Paddy Considine – Dog Altogether (2007), Jane Linfoot – Seaview (2013), and Colin Kennedy – I Love Luci (2010).

As well as nurturing writing and directing talent, Sigma regularly brings on new producers and has mentored Brian Coffey – Hush (2017), Swung (2015), The Legend of Barney Thomson (2015), Starred Up (2013), Citadel (2012), and I Love Luci (2010), and inspired Anna Duffield – Trout (2007), Dog Altogether (2007), Terra Firma (2008), Seaview (2013) & Donkeys (2010).

Film City Glasgow 
Gillian Berrie founded Film City Glasgow, a production and post-production facility located in the old Govan Town Hall. The project was inspired by a trip to Zentropa's 'filmbyen' ('film city' in Danish) in 2000, a film studio complex located in Hvidovre just outside Copenhagen, Denmark. At that time Glasgow desperately needed a production base for both indigenous and visiting productions. With the help of Helena Ward, Steve Inch and Lenny Crooks, Berrie secured the 65,000 square foot building which was the original Govan Town Hall and raised £3.5 million for its redevelopment.

Film City is home to post-production companies Serious and Savalas (and their Dolby theatre) and production companies including Keo, Finestripe and Hopscotch. The University of the West of Scotland also has a base there. It has also been used as a studio for film and television productions including; Jon S. Baird's Filth (2013), Lynne Ramsay's Ratcatcher (1999), David Mackenzie's Hallam Foe (2007), Shona Auerbach's Dear Frankie (2004), BBC's Mrs Brown's Boys, Frankie Boyle's Tramadol Nights, WWII zombie trilogy Outpost (2008–2013), Idris Elba starring Legacy (2010) and most recently supernatural horror film Hush (2017).

JUMPCUT 
Sigma founded JUMPCUT, a charity providing opportunities in the screen industries to young people. Around 25 young people aged between 16 and 25 form a production company to make a professional, budgeted short film under an intensive programme mentored by the country's leading industry professionals. 75% of JUMPCUT's alumni go on to forge careers in the film industry.

JUMPCUT's first film was sci-fi short Good Souls (2013), directed by Elizabeth Randon and starring Daniel Cahill, Finlay MacMillan, and Bobby Rainsbury. It premiered at goNORTH Festival in Inverness.

The next batch of emerging filmmaker's made Dropping Off Michael (2015), starring Brian McCardie and his nephew Michael McCardie. The film was directed by Zam Salim and picked up the audience award at the Glasgow Short Film Festival and a nomination for Best Short Film at the BAFTA Scotland 2015 Awards.

JUMPCUT's latest production, Misgivings (2016) was filmed in May 2016 at Film City Glasgow and is directed by Adrian Mead. The film was written by Jahvel Hall, starring Kathryn Howden and Scott Reid.

Filmography

Awards

Academy Awards

BAFTA Awards

BAFTA Scotland Awards

Berlin International Film Festival

British Independent Film Awards

Cannes Film Festival

References

Film production companies of the United Kingdom